David Gordon Blackbourn (born 1949 in Spilsby, Lincolnshire, England) is Cornelius Vanderbilt Distinguished Chair of History at Vanderbilt University, where he teaches modern German and European history. Prior to arriving at Vanderbilt, Blackbourn was Coolidge Professor of History at Harvard University.

Career

Blackbourn went to Leeds Modern School (now Lawnswood School), and then read history at Christ's College, Cambridge, before moving to Jesus College.

After completing his dissertation at Jesus College, Blackbourn became a lecturer at Queen Mary College in 1976, before joining the faculty of Birkbeck College in 1979.

In 1992 Blackbourn moved to the USA, where he was Coolidge Professor of History at Harvard, and served as director of the university's Minda de Gunzburg Center for European Studies from 2007 to 2012. He was awarded a Guggenheim Fellowship in 1994. He was chair of the Harvard History Department from 1998 to 1999 and again from 2000 to 2002.  In 2007, he was elected a Fellow of the American Academy of Arts and Sciences.

As of July 2018, Blackbourn is compiling a transnational history of Germany in the world from 1500 to 2000.

He is on the editorial board of the journal Past & Present; the academic advisory board of the Institute for European History, Mainz; and the advisory board of the Friends of the German Historical Institute, Washington. He was president of the Conference Group on Central European History of the American Historical Association (since 2012 called Central European History Society) in 2003–2004. Since 2016, he has served as a trustee of the National Humanities Center in Research Triangle Park, NC.

Works
Class, Religion, and Local Politics in Wilhelmine Germany (1980)
The Peculiarities of German History (with G. Eley, 1984) (online)
Populists and Patricians (1987)
The German Bourgeoisie (co-edited with R. Evans, 1991)
Marpingen: Apparitions of the Virgin Mary in Nineteenth-Century Germany (1994)
The Long Nineteenth Century: A History of Germany, 1780–1918 (1997)
The Conquest of Nature: Water, Landscape, and the Making of Modern Germany (2006).

References

External links
 Faculty page at the Vanderbilt University Department of History
 "History of the Historian": Profile of Blackbourn in Harvard Magazine

1949 births
Living people
21st-century American historians
Academics of Birkbeck, University of London
Academics of Queen Mary University of London
Alumni of Christ's College, Cambridge
Alumni of Jesus College, Cambridge
American Marxist historians
American male non-fiction writers
British Marxist historians
Fellows of the American Academy of Arts and Sciences
German Historical Institute, Washington, DC
Harvard University faculty
Historians of Europe
Historians of Germany
Vanderbilt University faculty
21st-century American male writers
Corresponding Fellows of the British Academy